Aurelian Gabriel Ciuciulete (born 4 April 2003) is a Romanian international footballer who plays as a midfielder for Metaloglobus București, on loan from FCSB.

Career statistics

Club
Statistics accurate as of match played 3 December 2022.

References

External links
 
 

2003 births
Living people
Sportspeople from Craiova
Romanian footballers
Romania youth international footballers
Association football midfielders
Liga I players
FC Steaua București players
Liga II players
FC Unirea Constanța players
Liga III players
FC Steaua II București players